Almamy Schuman Bah (born 24 August 1974), also known as Schuman Bah, is a Guinean football player.

Club career
In 2004, he went from FC Metz to Turkish Super League team Malatyaspor. However, because of injuries, he could play only 15 matches for the Turkish side and his contract was cancelled at the end of season and he moved to Clermont Foot.

Other teams he has played for are Le Mans UC72, Berrichonne de Châteauroux and Neuchâtel Xamax.

International career
He was part of the Guinean 2004 African Nations Cup team, who finished second in their group in the first round of competition, before losing in the quarter finals to Mali.

References

External links
 
 

1974 births
Living people
Citizens of Guinea through descent
Guinean footballers
French footballers
Guinea international footballers
Guinean expatriate footballers
Le Mans FC players
LB Châteauroux players
FC Metz players
Clermont Foot players
AS Cannes players
Ligue 1 players
Ligue 2 players
2004 African Cup of Nations players
French sportspeople of Guinean descent
Association football defenders
Black French sportspeople